The 1952 New Hampshire Wildcats football team was an American football team that represented the University of New Hampshire as a member of the Yankee Conference during the 1952 college football season. In its fourth year under head coach Chief Boston, the team compiled a perfect 3–4–1 record (0–4 against conference opponents) and finished sixth out of six teams in the Yankee Conference.

Schedule

References

New Hampshire
New Hampshire Wildcats football seasons
New Hampshire Wildcats football